"You Give Me Those Feelings" is a song written by Lynsey de Paul, and produced by de Paul and Jon Kelly. It was released as a non-album single, with the B-side "Beautiful" also composed by de Paul, on Polydor in August 1977, as the follow up to the European hit single "Rock Bottom". The German and French releases of the single both had picture sleeves. The romantic song makes clever use of vocal overdubbing and has a false ending making the shorter version more radio friendly that the whole song, which clocks in at over four minutes. The song was play listed by a number of British radio stations. It is listed as one of the songs of 1977 in a German music database as one of the songs of the year 1977. 

A cover version of "You Give Me Those Feelings" was recorded by Gracie Rivera, who was based in Hong Kong but originally from the Philippines. Rivera's version was released as a track on her hit fourth album, Grace Anne Rivera. The album was released in 1978 on the EMI record label (EMGS-6031). 

Originally released as a stand alone single, de Paul's original recording was more recently released for the first time on CD as a track on her 2013 anthology album Into My Music. A different, updated, recording of B-side song "Beautiful" was also included on the anthology CD. "You Give Me Those Feelings" still receives radio plays, most recently (7 November 2016) on CXCU Night Trax hosted by Professor Mike.

References

Lynsey de Paul songs
Songs written by Lynsey de Paul
Polydor Records singles
1977 singles